Gay Apostolic Pentecostals are people who adhere to the beliefs of the Oneness Pentecostal churches and who identify as LGBT affirming. Gay Apostolic Pentecostals first began to organize separately from mainline Oneness Pentecostal churches in 1980 in Schenectady, New York.

History
The movement to create gay-affirming churches had begun in 1968 with the founding of the Metropolitan Community Church.

NGPA and ARM
The movement to create LGBT-affirming Apostolic or Oneness Pentecostal churches began in 1980 in the city of Schenectady, New York. The founder of the affirming Apostolic Pentecostal movement, Reverend William H. Carey, envisioned an international network of affirming Oneness Pentecostal churches, including the more fundamentalist theology inherent with such churches. He began what was known as the National Gay Pentecostal Alliance (NGPA). The organization opened its first church in Omaha, Nebraska in 1981.  The first three ministers were Carey, E. Samuel Stafford, and Frances Cervantes. Later in 1983, the Reverend Sandy Lewis, District Elder, and Reverend Phildora Prigmore came into the NGPA organization in Tucson, Az to further the movement.

Although NGPA was an Apostolic (Oneness) Pentecostal organization, due to the lack of affirming Trinitarian Pentecostal churches, NGPA originally welcomed all affirming Pentecostals to belong to their churches. Once Trinitarian Pentecostals began to organize their own churches, NGPA became fully Oneness Pentecostal.

The Apostolic Intercessory Ministries (AIM) was formed in 1998 by Rev. Sandy Lewis, Rev. Phildora Prigmore, and Rev. Donald Rollins. This offshoot of the NGPA was organized to help establish new churches.
In August 2003, AIM officially joined with the NGPA under the new name Apostolic Restoration Mission (ARM).  AIM retained its name as a discrete mission within the ARM organization. Rev. Elliott Prigmore Lewis (formerly Rev. Sandy Lewis) and Rev. Phildora Prigmore Lewis continued with ARM.

FRPI
The Fellowship of Reconciling Pentecostals International (FRPI) is Oneness Pentecostal, and got its start in 1998 in Little Rock, Arkansas with a meeting of five Apostolic ministers who were interested in forming an affirming Pentecostal ministry. Following a second meeting in Fall 1999 in Tampa, Florida, two of the ministers, Douglas E. Clanton and Robert L. Morgan, officially organized the FRPI in Tampa in June 2000.  The organization was incorporated in 2003, and is currently headquartered in LaPorte, Indiana. The FRPI is affiliated with seven churches in the U.S. and the Philippines.

CN
About the same time the FRPI was being formed, another organization was coming together in Atlanta, Georgia. The Covenant Network is Trinitarian Pentecostal, and was initially formed in 1998 by Randy and Johnny Layton-Morgan. The Covenant Network is currently affiliated with 16 churches in the US, and three separate missions in Australia, Mexico, and Puerto Rico.

GAAAP
The Global Alliance of Affirming Apostolic Pentecostals (GAAAP) is Oneness Pentecostal, and was formed in 2007 in Tampa, Florida. In March 2010, ARM merged with the larger GAAAP under the GAAAP name. At their 2011 annual conference, the alliance reformed under a new Constitution and Bylaws and consecrated their first Presiding Bishop and Assistant Bishop. GAAAP currently has ministries in four countries.

APCI
The Affirming Pentecostal Church International is Oneness Pentecostal, and has 32 churches in the US and ministries in 24 countries.

AIM
Since Rev. William H. Carey founded the Oneness Pentecostal Apostolic Institute of Ministry in 1981, students from across the United States and around the world have been enrolled in his classes. Rev. Elliott Prigmore Lewis (formerly Rev. Sandy Lewis) and Rev. Phildora Prigmore Lewis continued to assist and teach Rev. William Carey’s program until 2014. Now called Affirming Institutes of Ministry, for ministers, future ministers, and students of the Word under Rev. Gem Embrey.

Theology
LGBT-affirming Apostolic Pentecostals share the same basic doctrinal beliefs as other Apostolic (Oneness) Pentecostals. These include the Oneness of God, the plan of salvation consisting of repentance, water baptism by immersion in Jesus' name for the forgiveness of sins, and receiving the infilling of the Holy Ghost with the initial evidence of speaking in other tongues. One major area of difference is the belief that homosexuality is not sinful, and that God blesses same-sex marriage. Affirming Apostolics maintain that scripture in the original languages did not condemn homosexuality as it is understood today, but did record same-sex relationships. This view is disputed by mainstream Apostolic (Oneness) Pentecostals, who view homosexuality as sinful and satanic in origin.

Controversy
In 2017 the Society for Pentecostal Studies (SPS) was set to have a convention and annual meeting at Urshan College of Florissant, Missouri, affiliated with the United Pentecostal Church International (UPCI), and a speaker was a politically connected LGBT activist. The SPS supported the arrangement, even though organization bylaws place the society within the tradition of Pentecostal churches that marriage is considered between a man and a woman. The school withdrew their invitation to SPS that has had past controversies. In 2013 the SPS then-President Paul Alexander called for the society to be open to the promotion of homosexual, transgender, and intersex Pentecostal and Charismatic Christianity, and was dismissed. In 2010 Tony Jones was dis-invited from North Central University (NCU) in Minneapolis, Minnesota, which is affiliated with the Assemblies of God, because he advocated same-sex marriage.

References

External links
  Official website of Reconciling Pentecostal International Fellowship of Churches (Oneness Pentecostal)
 Official website of Covenant Network of Churches (Trinitarian Pentecostal)
 Official website of Global Alliance of Affirming Apostolic Pentecostals (Oneness Pentecostal)
 Official website of Affirming Institute of Ministry (Oneness Pentecostal)

Oneness Pentecostalism
LGBT churches in the United States